La abuela is a 1981 Colombian drama film directed by Leopoldo Pinzón. The plot follows a traditional well to do decadent family in Bogotá ruled by a domineering and despotic grandmother who only loves her favorite grandson. It was based on a popular Colombian soap opera of the same name.

Cast 
 Teresa Gutierrez as Brigida Paredes "La abuela"
 Lucero Galindo as Victoria
 José Saldarriaga as Hernancito
 Gloria Gómez as Libertad
 Ana Mojica as Zenobia

References

Citations

Sources
Fundación Patrimonio Fílmico Colombiano. Nieto, Jorge (edit), Largometrajes Colombianos En Cine y Video: 1915-2004, Fundación Patrimonio Fílmico Colombiano, Ministerio de Cultura, 2006, 

1981 films
Colombian drama films
Films set in Colombia
1980s Spanish-language films